The history of central bank digital currencies (CBDCs) is a short, recent history. CBDCs are still in a conceptual stage, with many countries exploring their possible implementation.

Bahamas
On 20 October 2020, the Central Bank of the Bahamas introduced the "Sand Dollar" as a digital legal currency equivalent to the traditional Bahamian dollar.

Brazil
In 2020, the Central Bank of Brazil announced plans for a digital currency by 2022, although these plans were pushed back by two or three years in 2021.

China

Since 2014, China's central bank has been working on a project called DCEP (Digital Currency Electronic Payment) or digital renminbi, often also referred to as the "digital yuan" as it would be backed by the yuan.

At the end of 2017, the China’s central bank organized a number of banks and institutions to jointly develop the DCEP system. In April 2020, DCEP began to be tested in four big Chinese cities: Shenzhen, Suzhou, Xiong'an and Chengdu.

The Shenzhen and Suzhou trials chose participants through a lottery, enabling them to use the DCEP in designated specific areas. The Shenzhen trial only included online payment functionalities, generally using QR codes like Alipay and WeChat Pay. However, along with online payments, the Suzhou trials also enabled the users to make near-field communication (NFC) offline payments. This feature was originally designed for people in rural areas who do not have reliable internet access.

After the successful CBDC pilot, Suzhou City Municipal signed a Memorandum of Understanding (MoU) with the New York-based blockchain startup, Cypherium for the company to help the city in the development of products in the city.

At the end of 2021 there were 261 million users in the extended trial who had made US$13.8 billion of transactions  It has also been rolled out for foreign attendees at the 2022 Winter Olympics in Beijing, where it has seen limited use due to entrenched digital currencies and Visa, as well as lack of publicity.

On March 31, 2022, People's Bank of China announced that the testing has been further expanded to six additional regions: Tianjin, Chongqing, Guangzhou, Fuzhou, Xiamen, and six cities in the province of Zhejiang that are hosting the 2022 Asian Games (Hangzhou, Ningbo, Wenzhou, Huzhou, Shaoxing, and Jinhua). Another news statement from PBOC shows that the city of Beijing and Zhangjiakou are also being included on the list of testing after the 2022 Winter Olympics.

Ecuador
One of the earliest examples of retail CBDC was in Ecuador from 2014 to 2018, when the central bank created a broadly accessible pilot retail CBDC that operated through citizens' mobile phones (it did not employ blockchain technology). The program closed in part due to low citizen adoption.

European Union/Eurozone
In the Eurozone, the Bank of Spain's former governor Miguel Angel Fernandez Ordoñez has called for the introduction of a digital euro, but the European Central Bank (ECB) has so far denied such possibility. Nevertheless, in December 2019, the ECB stated that "The ECB will also continue to assess the costs and benefits of issuing a central bank digital currency (CBDC) that could ensure that the general public will remain able to use central bank money even if the use of physical cash eventually declines".
On 2 October 2020 the ECB nonetheless published a report on the proposed digital euro and kickstarted a phase of experiments to consider the merits of minting such a central bank digital currency. Based on this, it will then decide whether to pursue or abandon plans to issue a digital euro toward mid-2021.

France and Switzerland
In June 2021, the Swiss National Bank and Bank of France launched a cross-border CBDC payments trial designed for wholesale (bank-to-bank, rather than with regular consumers) transactions. Switzerland had previously tested a digital Swiss franc for instant transactions on SIX Swiss Exchange, its premier stock exchange.

Ghana

India 

The Reserve Bank of India (RBI) on 16 December 2020 announced a regulatory sandbox to test next generation technologies on cross border payments to collect field test data and evidence of benefits and risks on the financial ecosystem. On 29 January 2021, Government of India proposed a bill to ban trading and investments in cryptocurrencies while giving legal power to the RBI for developing CBDC.

During the announcement of the 2022 Union budget of India, Nirmala Sitharaman from Ministry of Finance announced the roll out of the Digital Rupee from 2023. As per the RBI Payments Vision 2025 document released on 17 June 2022, CBDC will be used for domestic and cross border payment processing and settlement. RBI classified CBDC into retail CBDC that will be designed to complete individual financial needs and wholesale CBDC which will be traded between RBI, Public and Private sector banks for currency distribution purpose and economic stability.

Pilot project for digital rupee was launched on 1 November 2022.

Indonesia 
Bank Indonesia initiated Garuda Project, a project to develop Indonesian central bank digital currency on 30 November 2022. Bank Indonesia issued the white paper on digital Rupiah development. By passage of the Law on Financial Sector Development and Strengthening, digital Rupiah is legalized as form of Rupiah.

Iran
2016-2018 interest in CBDCs in Iran was alleged by American analysts to be for the purposes of evading American sanctions.

Myanmar
On 26 June 2022, Myanmar's National Unity Government (NUG) issued an official statement regarding the establishment of DMMK, along with its companion mobile wallet NUGPay, although the news was announced in earlier date. According to Ministry of Planning, Finance and Investment of NUG, 1 DMMK is equivalent to 1 MMK and the exchange rate will be announced on weekly basis.

Nigeria

In May 2021, the Central Bank of Nigeria announced that Nigeria would create a digital currency. In July 2021  it further said that it will launch the pilot scheme on 1 October 2021. Following these announcements, the central bank named Bitt Inc. in August 2021 as its technical partner for Nigeria's digital currency that would be known as ENaira.

New Zealand
In September 2021, public consultation on a CBDC for New Zealand was opened by the Reserve Bank. The potential digital currency would be tied 1:1 to the New Zealand dollar.

Norway
In April 2021, after four years of research, Norway's Norges Bank announced plans to start testing technical solutions for a CBDC over the following two years.

Russia
In October 2020, the Central Bank of Russia published a consultation paper on a digital ruble. It aims to have a prototype ready by the end of 2021 and start pilots and trials in 2022.

Sweden
The central bank of Sweden proposed an "e-krona" in November 2016, and started testing an e-krona proof of concept in 2020. The 2020 phase focused on internal simulations within Sweden's central bank; the 2021 second phase is to include transactions with outside entities, such as commercial banks. The 2022 third phase focused on the requirements.

Turkey
In January 2021, the Central Bank of Turkey announced a planned digital currency trial in the second half of 2021.

Ukraine
In December 2018, the National Bank of Ukraine piloted a digital currency, the e-hryvnia, with about 5,500 tokens. It is considering how to technically advance a nationwide launch.

United Kingdom

The Bank of England discussed a blockchain-based central bank currency in a September 2015 speech by chief economist Andrew G. Haldane, on possible ways to implement negative interest rates. A March 2016 speech by Ben Broadbent, the bank's deputy governor of monetary policy, appears to be the first use of the phrase "central bank digital currency", and notes direct inspiration by Bitcoin. In April 2021, the Bank of England and HM Treasury announced a joint CBDC Taskforce to examine the possibility of a CBDC in the UK.

United States
In May 2021, Federal Reserve Chair Jerome Powell announced plans to publish a discussion paper on central bank digital currency, focusing on the possibility of issuing a US CBDC. Powell believed that a potential CBDC would complement the use of cash and bank deposits rather than replacing them. In February 2022 the Federal Reserve Bank of Boston released initial details of Project Hamilton, a potential United States CBDC.  While incorporating some of the architecture of bitcoin, it would not be decentralized nor have mining.

Also in May 2021, the Digital Dollar Project, which is not affiliated with the United States government, planned to launch five pilot programmes, testing the potential use of a central bank digital currency in the United States of America.

On March 9, 2022, President Joe Biden signed an executive order on ensuring responsible development of digital assets, the White House said.

On November 15, 2022, the Federal Reserve Bank of New York's Innovation Center (NYIC) announced a 12 week proof-of-concept pilot program. The pilot will build a prototype and test a theoretical network known as the regulated liability network (RLN). The network will aim to provide a "...multi-asset, always-on, programmable infrastructure containing digital representations of central bank, commercial bank, and regulated non-bank issuer liabilities, denominated in U.S. dollars." The pilot project will be conducted in a test environment and will only use "simulated data" with a version of the RLN that operates exclusively in U.S. dollars. Commercial banks will issue simulated digital money as fungible tokens that will represent customer deposits, and settle through simulated central bank reserves via a distributed multi-entity ledger.

Several major U.S. banks are participating in the pilot, including BNY Mellon, Citi, HSBC, Mastercard, PNC Bank, TD Bank, Truist, U.S. Bank and Wells Fargo. Swift will support international interoperability.

Uruguay
In November 2017, the central bank of Uruguay announced to begin a test to issue digital Uruguayan pesos.

Venezuela

2016-2018 interest in CBDCs in Venezuela was alleged by American analysts to be for the purposes of evading American sanctions. To this end, Venezuela launched the blockchain-backed CBDC petro in 2018, although this project failed. Venezuela launched a digital currency—the petro—in 2018, which is purportedly backed by oil, natural gas, and mineral reserves and administered using blockchain technology. The petro has not been adopted for general use and may not truly function as a currency.

References

Monetary reform
 
CBDCs